Eden Vadimovich Kartsev (or Kartzev, ; born 11 April 2000) is an Israeli professional footballer who plays as a defensive midfielder for Turkish Süper Lig club İstanbul Başakşehir and the Israel national team.

He also holds a Belarusian passport.

Club career
Kartsev made his professional debut for Maccabi Tel Aviv in Israel's Toto Cup Al on 12 August 2017, coming on as a substitute in the 72nd minute for Shlomi Yosef Azulay against fellow Israeli Premier League side Hapoel Ra'anana. He made his first appearance in the Israeli Premier League on 9 February 2018 while on loan at Beitar Tel Aviv Bat Yam, starting in the away match against Hapoel Nir Ramat HaSharon.

On 12 August 2022, Kartsev agreed on a transfer with Russian Premier League club Dynamo Moscow, on loan with an option to buy. On 23 August 2022, the deal between Dynamo Moscow and Maccabi Netanya was cancelled due to the sanctions imposed on the Russian banks after the 2022 Russian invasion of Ukraine, the Dynamo Moscow payment did not reach Maccabi Netanya's account by the deadline specified in the contract, and then Kartsev returned to Israeli Premier League club Maccabi Netanya.

On 30 January 2023, Kartsev signed a 4.5 year contract worth €2,250,000 with Süper Lig club İstanbul Başakşehir after the Turkish side agreed to pay Maccabi Netanya the €2,300,000 transfer fee (highest transfer fee in the history of Netanya).

Personal life
Kartsev was born in Afula, Israel, to parents from Minsk, Belarus who immigrated to Israel in 1996. His father Vadim Kartsev is a former footballer who played in Belarus for FC Vitebsk and in Israel for Sektzia Ness Ziona and Hapoel Afula. He has an older sister who also resides in Israel. Kartsev and his family also speak fluent Russian.

International career
Kartsev made his senior international debut for Israel on 11 October 2020 in a 2020–21 UEFA Nations League B match, coming on as a 88th-minute substitute in the 1–2 home loss against the Czech Republic.

He also plays for Israel U21 since 2018.

Career statistics

International

Honours

Club

Maccabi Tel Aviv
 Toto Cup (1): 2020-21
 Israel Super Cup (1): 2020

References

External links
 
 
 
 

2000 births
Living people
Israeli footballers
Belarusian footballers
People with acquired Belarusian citizenship
Footballers from Afula
Israel youth international footballers
Israel under-21 international footballers
Israel international footballers
Association football midfielders
Maccabi Tel Aviv F.C. players
Beitar Tel Aviv Bat Yam F.C. players
Hapoel Hadera F.C. players
Hapoel Ironi Kiryat Shmona F.C. players
Maccabi Netanya F.C. players
İstanbul Başakşehir F.K. players
Israeli Premier League players
Liga Leumit players
Süper Lig players
Israeli expatriate footballers
Expatriate footballers in Turkey
Israeli expatriate sportspeople in Turkey
Israeli people of Belarusian descent
Israeli people of Soviet descent